Valérie Marcoux (born April 1, 1980 in Ottawa, Ontario) is a Canadian former pair skater. With partner Craig Buntin, she is a three-time Canadian national champion. Prior to teaming up with Buntin in 2002, she skated with Bruno Marcotte. Marcoux announced her retirement from competitive figure skating on April 24, 2007.

Programs

With Buntin

With Marcotte

Results 
GP: Grand Prix

With Buntin

With Marcotte

References

External links

 
 
 Skate Canada profile

1980 births
Canadian female pair skaters
Franco-Ontarian people
Olympic figure skaters of Canada
Figure skaters at the 2006 Winter Olympics
Living people
Sportspeople from Ottawa
Four Continents Figure Skating Championships medalists